Rafael Ruiz Gijón (December 10, 1916 – August 9, 2006) was a Spanish field hockey player. He competed in the 1948 Summer Olympics.

He was a member of the Spanish field hockey team, which was eliminated in the group stage. He played all three matches as goalkeeper in the tournament.

References

External links
 

1916 births
2006 deaths
Spanish male field hockey players
Olympic field hockey players of Spain
Field hockey players at the 1948 Summer Olympics